Village People is the debut studio album by Village People, released on July 18, 1977. Its hit song "San Francisco (You've Got Me)" reached the top 50 in the UK, peaking at #45.

History
Village People was the creation of Jacques Morali, a French composer. He had written a few dance tunes when he was given a demo tape recorded by singer/actor Victor Willis.  Morali approached Willis and told him, "I had a dream that you sang lead on my album and it went very, very big". Willis agreed.

The album was a success, and demand for live appearances soon followed.  Morali, his business partner Henri Belolo (under the collaboration Can't Stop Productions) and Willis hastily built a group of dancers to perform with Willis in clubs and on Dick Clark's American Bandstand.  As Village People's popularity grew, Morali, Belolo and Willis saw the need for a permanent 'group.'  They took out an ad in a music trade magazine which read: "Macho Types Wanted: Must Dance And Have A Moustache."
  
Although the composers were French, the lyrics were all in English as Morali and Belolo used American lyricists.  On the first album, they brought in songwriters Phil Hurtt and the aforementioned Peter Whitehead.

The band's name references New York City's Greenwich Village neighborhood, at the time known for having a substantial gay population. Morali and Belolo got the inspiration for creating an assembly of American man archetypes based on the gay men of The Village who frequently dressed in various fantasy attire.

Track listing
All songs written by Jacques Morali, Henri Belolo, Peter Whitehead and Phil Hurtt, except track 2 (Morali, Belolo, Hurtt).

Production
Executive Producer: Henri Belolo
Produced by Jacques Morali for Can't Stop Production Inc.
Recorded and mixed by Gerald Block; assistant engineer: J.D. Stewart
All songs published by Can't Stop Music.

Charts

Weekly charts

Certifications

References

External links

1977 debut albums
Village People albums
Casablanca Records albums
Albums produced by Jacques Morali